Cured fish is fish which has been cured by subjecting it to fermentation, pickling, smoking, or some combination of these before it is eaten. These food preservation processes can include adding salt, nitrates, nitrite or sugar, can involve smoking and flavoring the fish, and may include cooking it. The earliest form of curing fish was dehydration. Other methods, such as smoking fish or salt-curing also go back for thousands of years. The term "cure" is derived from the Latin curare, meaning to take care of. It was first recorded in reference to fish in 1743.


History

According to Binkerd and Kolari (1975), the practice of preserving meat by salting it originated in Asian deserts. "Saline salts from this area contained impurities such as nitrates that contributed to the characteristic red colour of cured meats. As early as 3,000 BC in Mesopotamia, cooked meats and fish were preserved in sesame oil and dried salted meat and fish were part of the Sumerian diet. Salt from the Dead Sea was in use by Jewish inhabitants around 1,600 BC, and by 1,200 BC, the Phoenicians were trading salted fish in the Eastern Mediterranean region. By 900 BC, salt was being produced in "salt gardens" in Greece and dry salt  curing and smoking of meat were well established. The Romans (200 BC) acquired curing procedures from the Greeks and further developed methods to "pickle" various kinds of meats in a brine marinade. It was during this time that the reddening effect of salting was noted. Saltpeter (potassium nitrate) is mentioned as being gathered in China and India prior to the Christian era for use in meat curing... In Medieval times, the application of salt and saltpeter as curing ingredients was commonplace and the reddening effect on meat was attributed to saltpeter."

Salt curing

Salt (sodium chloride) is a primary ingredient used to cure fish and other foods. Removal of water and addition of salt to fish creates a solute-rich environment where osmotic pressure draws water out of microorganisms, retarding their growth.  Doing this requires a concentration of salt of nearly 20%. Iodized table salt may be used, but the iodine generally causes a dark end product and a bitter taste. Non-iodized salts like those used for canning and pickling foods and sea salt are the preferred types of salt to use for curing meats.

Sugar curing

Sugar is sometimes added when curing fish, particularly salmon. The sugar can take many forms, including honey, corn syrup solids, and maple syrup. Adding sugar alleviates the harsh flavor of the salt. It also contributes to the growth of beneficial bacteria like Lactobacillus by feeding them.

Nitrates and nitrites
Nitrates and nitrites have been used for hundreds of years to prevent botulism in fish and ensure microbial safety. Nitrates help kill bacteria, produce a characteristic flavor, and give fish a pink or red color. The use of nitrates in food preservation is controversial.  This is due to the potential for the formation of nitrosamines when the preserved food is cooked at high temperature. However, the production of carcinogenic nitrosamines can be potently inhibited by the use of the antioxidants Vitamin C and the alpha-tocopherol form of Vitamin E during curing. A 2007 study by Columbia University suggests a link between eating cured meats and chronic obstructive pulmonary disease. Nitrites were posited as a possible cause. The use of either compound is carefully regulated. For example, the FDA Code of Federal Regulations states that sodium nitrite may be safely used: "As a color fixative in smoked cured tunafish products so that the level of sodium nitrite does not exceed 10 parts per million (0.001 percent) in the finished product... As a preservative and color fixative, with or without sodium nitrate, in smoked, cured sablefish, smoked, cured salmon, and smoked, cured shad so that the level of sodium nitrite does not exceed 200 parts per million and the level of sodium nitrate does not exceed 500 parts per million in the finished product."

Smoking

Fish can also be preserved by smoking, which is drying the fish with smoke from burning or smoldering plant materials, usually wood. Smoking helps seal the outer layer of the food being cured, making it more difficult for bacteria to enter. It can be done in combination with other curing methods such as salting. Common smoking styles include hot smoking, smoke roasting and cold smoking.  Smoke roasting and hot smoking cook the fish while cold smoking does not. If the fish is cold smoked, it should be dried quickly to limit bacterial growth during the critical period where the fish is not yet dry. This can be achieved by drying thin slices of fish.

Cured fish dishes
 anchovies — Europe and Southeast Asia, brine-preserved, fermented, or dried
 bacalhau — Portugal and Spain, Cod cured in salt, then dried. It needs to be re-hydrated and de-salted before use. 
 dried cod — Norway and Italy, dried, fermented cod. The cod is soaked before use.
 Bottarga — salted and cured fish roe
 Ceviche — cured fish
 Jeotgal — Korean fermented seafood with salt and spices
 Po (food) — Korean dried marine fish (especially Alaska pollock)
 gravlax — Scandinavian raw salmon cured with sugar, salt, and spices, similar to lox
 lox — Europe, cured salmon fillet
 Matjes or Soused herring — The Netherlands and Eastern England
 pickled herring — Europe, especially Scandinavia, Poland, North Germany and the Baltic
 Pla ra — used as a flavouring in Thai cuisine
 Rollmops — Europe, Pickled herring fillets rolled around sliced onion and cucumber
 smoked salmon — Northern Europe (Denmark, Iceland, Norway, Sweden, England, Ireland and Scotland), a preparation of salmon, typically a fillet that has been cured and then hot or cold smoked
 Hákarl — Iceland, Greenland or basking shark which has been cured with a particular fermentation process and hung to dry
 Lutefisk — Nordic countries, dried whitefish that is prepared for eating by soaking in a lye solution for several days, soaking in plain water for several additional days to remove the lye, then cooked.

See also 

 Brining
 Charcuterie
 Curing salt
 List of dried foods
 List of smoked foods
 Pickling
 Pickling salt
 Salting (food)

Notes

References 

 McGee, Harold. On Food and Cooking (revised). New York, NY: Scribner, 2004. 
 Bertolli, Paul. Cooking by Hand. New York, NY: Clarkson Potter/Publishers, 2003. 
 National Research Council Academy of Life Sciences. "The Health Effects of Nitrate, Nitrite and N-Nitroso Compounds". Washington DC: National Academy Press, 1981.

Food preservation
Cooking techniques
Fish dishes
Smoked fish